Yiying Han, also known by her game ID Miss, is a Chinese Warcraft 3 professional female player, StarCraft 2 professional female player, LOL commentator and game host. She was born in Neijiang, Sichuan and graduated from Hainan University.
She started her career from joining the First Women's Team of China—First in 2007 [2]. Suzhou champion of Dell-Suning Warcraft Female in April 2008; champion of WCG 2008 Samsung Electronics Cup Guangzhou Region WCGGirl Warcraft Female in June. Champion of Guangzhou WCG Warcraft Female in June 2009; third place of China WCG Warcraft Female in August. Champion of IronLady International Female Invitational in February 2010; champion of IP.girls Open Cup in June;

In February 2012, she became the first non-Korean female player in professional e-sports team in China; Champion of DIVINA China StarCraft 2 Female Tournament in March 2012; StarsWar 7 Best Female Player in June (the first female player to have won the title in Chinese e-sports history); retained the champion of DIVINA StarCraft 2 Female Tournament in August;In August 2010, she acted as the commentator for Warcraft in ECL Xi’an Final and officially became a professional female host [8]. In November 2015, she won the Prize for Most Popular Commentator of League of Legends awarded by the authority; 2016 Game Panoramic Awards Ceremony, Miss won the title of Most Popular Game Host in December 2016, she was awarded the Grand Prize for Top Ten Most Influential Gamers at Sina V Influence Summit; 2016 New Weekly & YY New Live Streaming Hosts Influence Grand Ceremony, Miss won the title of Most Commercially Valuable Game Host in January 2017, she won the Prize for Popular E-sports Host of the Year in the List of Host Chinese Games, and the video Miss’ Ranking Diary she made for teaching League of Legends won the Prize for Popular Game Videos of the Year.

Early life 

Yiying Han was born Neijiang, Sichuan. Her mother is a kindergarten principal who loves lyre-playing, chess, calligraphy, and painting while her father is a primary school math teacher who is fond of history. Yiying was a king of the children ever since she was a kid in her family. She likes playing games and skating, and once competed in ping-pong game and won the third place in the school. During her junior high school, she was always one of the top three in the whole grade. After graduating from senior high school, Yiying realized that she was not a boy and gradually became gentle, quiet and cute. She was even elected commissary in charge of entertainment in her class, and began to write some articles and had them published in the school journal. After graduating from senior high school, she entered Hainan University in Haikou to study accounting. During the university, she began to get interested in real-time strategy game [9]. In October 2006, Yiying Han met the game of her life, Warcraft 3[10].

Career

E-sports 

In May 2007, Yiying Han started her career from joining the First Women's Team of China—First [10]; in August, she competed in IEF Beijing Competition [11]; in October, she competed in Nanjing FCI invitational tournament; and in November, she competed in Lenovo IEST national professional masters’ invitational tournament [12].

In January 2008, Yiying Han joined Taiwan UMX Club; in April, she won the champion of Suzhou Female Group in Dell-Suning Warcraft Competition; in May, she joined Level99 club; on May 23, she officially joined UMX-Gaming Warcraft team [13]; in June, she won the champion in WCG 2008 Samsung Electronics Cup Guangzhou Competition Area WCG Girl Warcraft Women's Competition [14]; and in July, she competed in the Finals of China Area Championship of WCG 2008 Samsung Electronics Cup World E-sports Competition [15].

Champion of Guangzhou WCG Warcraft Female in June 2009; third place of China WCG Warcraft Female in August.

Champion of IronLady International Female Invitational in February 2010;

In March 2010, she joined Zhejiang Tianlu Tyloo Club [4]; later, she competed in the gaming of Warcraft 3 as Shenzhen representative team of 2010 National E-sports Open Tournament [17]; in June, she competed in iP.Girls Open Cup European, Russian and Chinese International Female Online Open Tournament and won the champion [6]; and in August, she competed in National E-sports Competition Shenzhen Open Tournament, and ranked top 16 finally as the only female player [2]. 
 
On February 14, 2012, Yiying Han joined Korean StarTale Combat Team [18]; in March, she competed in ZOWIE DIVINA China Starcraft 2 Queen's Competition and won the champion in the Competition [7]; and in June, she became the first player who won the prize for the best female StarsWar7 player in China. 
 
On June 8, 2015, Yiying Han led the master women's competition team to compete in E-sports Goddess Invitational Tournament [19].

Performing 

In August 2010, Yiying Han acted as the commentator for Warcraft in ECL Xi’an Final [8]; in December, she hosted the program GTV E-Sports World at game channel [2]; and in December, she acted as the commentator for Warcraft in ECL National Final [20].

In January 2011, Yiying Han acted as the commentator for Warcraft and DOTA competitions in WGT National Final; in August, she acted as the commentator for Warcraft 2, StarCraft 3 and DOTA competitions in WGT Chinese Final [18]; in September, she was invited by Korean TV station OGN to act as full-process commentator at the LG StarCraft 2 Invitational Tournament held at Beijing Water Cube [21]; and in December, she acted as the commentator for Warcraft, StarCraft, and DOTA competitions in WGT National Final.

In April 2012, Yiying Han acted as the commentator for StarCraft and DOTA competitions in ECL Season 1 Finals; in May, she acted as the commentator and host in the First Season of ACE DOTA Professional Tournament [22]; in June, she acted as the running commentator for World Final [23]; and in August, she acted as the running commentator for the Second DOTA2 international invitational tournament [24].

In 2013, she joined Gamefy and acted as a show host [25]; in March, Yiying Han acted as the running commentator for G·League StarCraft 2 [25]; later, she acted as the running commentator for G·League League of Legends WE:IG Final; between May to June, she acted as the running commentator for DOTA2 Super League together with Haitao and Yitian Zou; and in June, she published Miss’ Ranking Diary, a series of League of Legends teaching. On October 7, she published M7 Double Qualifying Game [26].

On November 22, 2015, Yiying Han won “2015 Prize for Most Popular Commentator of League of Legends” at League of Legends Awards Ceremony [27].

In February 2016, Yiying Han signed a contract with huga.com [28]; on October 17, she was on Who's Still Standing, a life service knowledge program of Jiangsu TV, and finally won the champion for giving right answers to five selected questions [29], with the audience rating sharply rising to number one among the programs broadcast during the same time brackets.

In August 2016, she won the Prize for the Most Popular Game Host at the 360 Game Panoramic Awards Ceremony; in December 2016, she won the Grand Prize for Top Ten Most Influential Gamers at Sina V Influence Summit.

In January 2017, 2016 Most Commercially Valuable Game Host of New Weekly & YY New Live Streaming Hosts Influence Grand Ceremony; in January 2017, she won the Prize for Popular E-sports Host of the Year in the List of Host Chinese Games, and the video Miss’ Ranking Diary she made for teaching League of Legends won the Prize for Popular Game Videos of the Year.

Editing of career data Competition data

Warcraft

StarCraft 

The data is 2012 ZOWIE DIVINA China StarCraft 2 Queen's Competition, against the player Zhuli ColaGirl. In the first competition, ColaGirl won; in the second competition, Miss won; in the third competition, ColaGirl won; in the fourth competition, Miss won; in the fifth competition, ColaGirl won; in the sixth competition, Miss won; in the seventh competition, Miss won, and finally won the champion in the Queen's Competition.

Competition Commentary

Award-winning Recordings

Personal Honors 
•	▪ 2017-01 2016 Most Commercially Valuable Game Host of New Weekly & YY New Live Streaming Hosts Influence Grand Ceremony (Won)

•	▪ 2017-01 The Prize for Popular E-sports Host of the Year in the List of Hot Chinese Games (Won)

•	▪ 2017-01 The Prize for Popular Game Videos of the Year in the List of Hot Chinese Games—Miss’ Ranking Diary (Won)

•	▪ 2016-12 The Grand Prize for Top Ten Most Influential Gamers at Sina V Influence Summit (Won)

•	▪ 2016-08 The Prize for the Most Popular Game Host at the 360 Game Panoramic Awards Ceremony (Won)

•	▪ 2015-11 The Prize for Most Popular Commentator of League of Legends Awarded by the Authority (Won)

Personal Comprehensive Awards 
•	▪ 2017-01 The Prize for Popular E-sports Host of the Year in the List of Hot Chinese Games [49](Won) 
 
•	▪ 2017-01 The Prize for Popular Game Videos of the Year in the List of Hot Chinese Games [50] Miss’ Ranking Diary (Won)
 
•	▪ 2016-12 The Grand Prize for Top Ten Most Influential Gamers at Sina V Influence Summit [51](Won) 
 
•	▪ 2016-08 The Prize for the Most Popular Game Host at the 360 Game Panoramic Awards Ceremony [52](Won) 
 
•	▪ 2015-11 Prize for Most Popular Commentator of League of Legends Awarded by the Authority [53](Won) 
 
•	▪ 2017-01 Most Commercially Valuable Game Host of New Weekly & YY New Live Streaming Hosts Influence Grand Ceremony [54] (Won)

Figure Evaluation 
The ID Miss symbolizes persistence, insistence and never-give-up spirit. In the times of Warcraft 3, Yiying Han was known as an elf who intrudes the World of Warcraft (WOW), with her popularity always staying at a high level. Later, she became the most popular GTV host after starting her career as a host and was known as the most versatile female commentator in China [8]. (Commented by Sohu)

After start playing StarCraft 2, Miss won the favor from professional teams for many times due to her high gaming level and hard work. Sweet and lovely Miss has been a strong-minded girl since childhood. She loves nearly all online games, video games, and casual games very much [4]. (Commented by PC Games)

Yiying Han is sweet and has a strong affinity [55]. Fresh and beautiful is her first impression to the audiences. Her adorableness also can attract the desire of the audiences to protect her [56]. (Commented by Tencent Games and TechWeb)

Yiying Han is a No.1 female star in China's e-sports industry. She has her own company and brand and is worthy over 100 million Yuan when she is less than 30 years old. She is the model of the younger generation. (Commented by Sohu)

References

1989 births
Living people
Chinese esports players
People from Neijiang
Sportspeople from Sichuan